

Aircraft

See also
 List of active Indian military aircraft
 List of Indian naval aircraft

References

Notes

Citations

Bibliography

 Andrade, John, U.S.Military Aircraft Designations and Serials since 1909 Midland Counties Publications, 1979, .
 Green, William, The Indian Air Force and its Aircraft Ducimus Books, London, 1982, ASIN B004YXNILM
 Sapru, Somanth, Combat Lore: Indian Air Force 1930-1945 K W Publishers, 2014, 978-9383649259
 Singh, Pushpindar, Aircraft of the Indian Air Force 1933-1973 English Book Store, New Delhi, 1974, ASIN B00K0Q8MX6

Indian Air Force historical aircraft list

Historical aircraft
Aircraft